Dione Francisco dos Santos (born 25 July 1979) is a former Brazilian football player.

Club career
He made his Primeira Liga debut for Vitória Setúbal on 13 March 2005 in a game against Vitória Guimarães.

Honours
Vitória Setúbal
Taça de Portugal: 2004–05

References

External links
 

1979 births
Living people
Brazilian footballers
Vila Nova Futebol Clube players
Associação Atlética Anapolina players
Vitória F.C. players
Brazilian expatriate footballers
Expatriate footballers in Portugal
Primeira Liga players
União Recreativa dos Trabalhadores players
Associação Atlética Aparecidense players
Araguaína Futebol e Regatas players
Association football defenders
União Esporte Clube players